Roop Kumar Rathod is an Indian music director and playback singer. He has performed a number of songs in Hindi, Gujarati, Marathi, 
Tamil, Telugu, Bengali, Oriya, Assamese, Nepali, Bhojpuri and Kannada films.

Personal life
Rathod is the second son of the late Pandit Chaturbhuj Rathod, a proponent of the oldest major vocal style associated with Hindustani classical music, Dhrupad. He belonged to the "Aditya Gharana of Jamnagar." He has two brothers, music composer Shravan Rathod, part of the Nadeem-Shravan duo, and singer Vinod Rathod. Roopkumar is married to Sunali Rathod, formerly the first wife of bhajan singer, Anup Jalota. Together they have a daughter named Reewa.

Musical beginnings
Roopkumar was introduced to the world of music during his early years. His journey began as a tabla player and he became sought after by many ghazal singers in the 1980s. He first began playback singing in 1989 with the song, "Main Tera Aashiq Hoon", composed by Laxmikant Pyarelal for the movie Gumrah.

Discography
The song "Sandese Aate Hai", from the movie Border, became one of the major breakthroughs of Rathod's career. With it, he received his only Filmfare award nomination to date at the 43rd Filmfare Awards. In addition, he sang "Tujh Mein Rab Dikhta Hai" for the movie Rab Ne Bana Di Jodi.

Apart from playback singing for films, Roopkumar has long played live concerts across the world with his wife Sunali, performing a mix of ghazal, Sufi, light classical music, and film songs.

Roopkumar has also performed with the artists Trilok Gurtu, Ranjit Barot and Abhijit Pohankar in fusion concerts. He and Gurtu  released the fusion album Beat of Love in December 2001 and the jazz album Broken Rhythms, in October 2004.

In August 2005, the comedy serial Sarabhai vs. Sarabhai featured Roopkumar and Sunali Rathod in one of their episodes that showcased a friendly musical contest.

Roopkumar, along with wife Sonali, won the title of 'Ustaad Jodi' on 'Mission Ustaad', a musical television reality show aired in February 2008, that aimed to create awareness about social causes.

In 2011 he released a sufi album along with Sunali Rathod called Kalma.

Filmography

Playback singer
 Angaar (1992) (playback singer)
 Gumrah (1993) (playback singer)
 Raja (1995) (playback singer) (as Roop Singh Rathod)
 Naajayaz (1995) (With Co-singer Kumar Sanu)
 Gaddaar (1995) (playback singer)
 Bhairavi (1996) (playback singer) (as Roopkumar Rathod)
 Prem Granth (1996) (playback singer) (as Roop Rathod)
 Border (1997) (playback singer) (as Roop Kumar Rathod)
 Kareeb (1998) (playback singer)
 Hero Hindustani(1998) (Aisi Waisi Baat Nahi)
 Vinashak – Destroyer (1998) (playback singer)
 Mother (1999) (playback singer)
 Hum Saath-Saath Hain: We Stand United (1999) (playback singer)
 Godmother (1999) (playback singer)
 Hu Tu Tu (1999) (playback singer) (as Roopkumar Rathod)
 Laawaris (1999) (playback singer)
 International Khiladi (1999) (playback singer) (as Roopkumar Rathod)
 Sarfarosh (1999) (playback singer: "Zindagi Maut Na Ban Jaye")
 Dillagi (1999) (playback singer)
 Thakshak (1999) (playback singer: "Khamosh Raat")
 Hogi Pyar Ki Jeet (1999) (playback singer: "Tere pyaar mein main marjawan")
 Mother (1999) (performer: "Pardesi to hain pardesi" (male))
 Mela (2000) (playback singer) (as Roopkumar Rathod)
 Krodh (2000) (playback singer)
 Dil Pe Mat Le Yaar!! (2000) (playback singer)
 Gaja Gamini (2000) (playback singer)
 Minnale (2001) (Tamil playback singer : "Venmathi venmathi")
 Censor (2001) (playback singer) (as Roopkumar Rathod)
 Rehnaa Hai Terre Dil Mein (2001) (playback singer)
 Rahul (2001) (playback singer)
 Bas Itna Sa Khwaab Hai (2001) (playback singer)
 Kitne Door Kitne Paas (2002) (playback singer) (as Roopkumar Rathod)
 Filhaal... (2002) (playback singer)
 Lal Salam (2002) (playback singer)
 Gunaah (2002) (playback singer)
 Jism (2003) (playback singer)
 Baaz: A Bird in Danger (2003) (playback singer)
 Armaan (2003) (playback singer)
 Tum – A Dangerous Obsession (2004) (playback singer) (as Roopkumar Rathod)
 Lakshya (2004) (playback singer)
 Veer-Zaara (2004) (performer: "Tere Liye")
 Tumsa Nahin Dekha (2004) (playback singer)
 Madhoshi (2004) (playback singer)
 Veer-Zaara (2004) (playback singer)
 Bhagmati (2005) (playback singer)
 Kokila  (2006) ("Snehama...")
 Shiva (2006)
 Pyar Kare Dis: Feel the Power of Love (Sindhi) (2007)
 Anwar (2007) (playback singer – Maula Mere)
 Life in a... Metro (2007) [In Dino (Reprise)]
 Drona (2008)
 Coffee House (2008)
 Rab Ne Bana Di Jodi (2008) [Tujh Mein Rab Dikhta Hai]
 Vaamanan (Tamil)(2009) (Oru Devathai)
 London Dreams (2009) [Barson Yaaron]
 Veer (2010) [Salam Aaya]
 Madrasapattinam (Tamil) (2010) (Pookal Pookum)
 Thamassu (Kannada) (2010) [Bragadiru]
 Tanu Weds Manu (2011) [Piya]
 Nee Paata Madhuram - The Touch of Love (3 movie) (Telugu version)
 Aye Raat Dheere Chal – The Touch of Love (3 movie)
 Khokababu (Bengali) (2012) [Mon Kande Pran Kande]
 Agneepath (2012) [O Saaiyan]
 Kevi Rite Jaish (2012) [Kevi Rite Jaish]
 Maharana Pratap: The First Freedom Fighter (2012) [Veer Pratap, Neela ghoda, Tha Hawaon Se Bhi Tej]
 Bharatiya (2012) [Bagh Ughaduni Daar]
 Nedunchalai (2013) (Tamil Injathea)
 Pitruroon (2013) (Marathi Film) [Dayaghana Re]
 Izhaar Maine Kiya Nahi (2014) (Hindi Film)[Mujhko Khabar Hai Ke Tu] 
Kerala Nattilam Pengaludane (2014; Tamil) ["Kollai Azhagu"]
 Meinu Ek Ladki Chaahiye (2014) [Nanhe Paon]
 Kaahe sataaye (2014) (Hindi Film) (Rang Rasiya) 
 "Brijlo" (બ્રીજલો) (2015) (Gujarati Film) (Bas Ek Chance)
 "Aaya Hai Dulha Dulhan Le Jayega (AHDDLJ)" (2018) (Hindi) (Nashe Ke Liye Sharab Chahiye) (Khoobsurat Aap Sa)

References

External links
 
 

Bollywood playback singers
Indian male playback singers
Indian film score composers
Indian male ghazal singers
Living people
Indian male film score composers
1973 births
Nepali-language singers from India